"Mr. Sandman" is the 15th episode of season 2 and the 37th overall of the supernatural drama  Grimm television series which premiered on March 22, 2013, on NBC. The episode was written by Alan DiFiore, and was directed by Norberto Barba.

Plot
Opening quote: "Now we've got eyes — eyes — a beautiful pair of children's eyes," he whispered.

A man named Andre (Kieren Hutchison) arrives at a support group meeting where he talks with a girl named Molly (Megan Henning) and takes her to her house. He then woges into a fly-like Wesen named Jinnamuru Xunte and releases a red powder on her, blinding her. He then consumes her tears and leaves. As she can't see, she accidentally brings down a shelf on herself and is killed. Nick (David Giuntoli) and Hank (Russell Hornsby) are sent to investigate while discovering that Molly left with Andre, who is possibly of South African origin. In Vienna, Adalind (Claire Coffee) meets with a woman, Frau Pech (Mary McDonald-Lewis), a Hexenbiest who agrees to help her with the baby. At night, Renard (Sasha Roiz) wakes up to find Juliette (Bitsie Tulloch) in his bed, who then woges into a creature, seemingly into a dream or a message from Frau Pech.

Andre goes after another victim, Kelly (Suzanne Tufan) but escapes when her sister, Casey (Jenny Wade) arrives. In the trailer, Nick, Hank and Monroe (Silas Weir Mitchell) find that the Jinnamuru Xunte feed from the tears of their victims. Kelly wakes up in the hospital with worms now spreading into her eyes. Andre is sighted at a high school and the police are sent there to apprehend him. Nick catches Andre, but Andre spreads the red powder on Nick, blinding him as well and fleeing.

Hank takes Nick to the spice shop where Rosalee (Bree Turner) and Monroe find that there's a cure for a vaccine but it requires them to extract the Jinnamuru Xunte's eye while alive and woged. Seemingly, Nick has now developed a sense where he manages to hear everything happening around him even if it's whispering. Casey returns home and is attacked by Andre. Hank is called and decides to go, bringing Nick, Monroe and Rosalee. They manage to knock out Andre and cut out his eye to make the antidote. Andre wakes up in his normal form and tries to escape but is stabbed by Casey.

Rosalee manages to mix the ingredients and restores Nick's sight. Juliette, who has been tormented by ghost visions, sees a ghost in his house that resembles Nick before disappearing. The episode ends as Nick discovers he now has more acute hearing and practices, with Monroe, hitting fruit while blindfolded, succeeding.

Reception

Viewers
The episode was viewed by 5.00 million people, earning a 1.4/4 in the 18–49 rating demographics on the Nielson ratings scale, ranking second on its timeslot and fifth for the night in the 18–49 demographics, behind a rerun of Shark Tank, Malibu Country, 20/20, and Last Man Standing. This was an slight increase in viewership from the previous episode, which was watched by 4.91 million viewers with a 1.4/5. This means that 1.4 percent of all households with televisions watched the episode, while 4 percent of all households watching television at that time watched it. With DVR factoring in, the episode was watched by 7.39 million viewers with a 2.4 ratings share in the 18–49 demographics.

Critical reviews
"Mr. Sandman" received positive reviews. The A.V. Club's Kevin McFarland gave the episode a "B−" grade and wrote, "Unfortunately, Grimms tendency to cherry-pick folktale elements doesn't work as well with Hofmman's story. Strip-mining for a few scary features, instead of using the story as a strong foundation, or as the launching point for a departure in narrative style, yields a basic case of the week plot with some scary elements, but with a disappointing lack of ambition. That's par for the course with Grimm, but when using such ripe source material, it makes the unremarkable goals of the show much more underwhelming."

Nick McHatton from TV Fanatic, gave a 4.0 star rating out of 5, stating: "'Mr. Sandman' didn't bring any dreams or cute things to Portland. This is Grimm, after all. Why bring dreams when you can bring death and blindness? The case of the week proved to be one of the greater investigations of Grimm Season 2. The idea of a man stealing the sight of people who are in periods of grief and, literally, having them lose their way all so he can find his own is pretty compelling."

Shilo Adams from TV Overmind, wrote: "Grossest episode of Grimm yet? I don’t mind a little gore, but the eye scooping and what happened to Kelly in the hospital were both disturbing."

Josie Campbell from TV.com wrote, "The short scenes with Adalind and Renard weren't enough to satisfy, especially since I care way more about the Royal machinations and inner workings of the Wesen world than I do about a lone monster criminal. The complex mythology is the best thing about this show, yet the writers seem to think we tune in for the boring, formulaic crime aspect. With most of Season 2 now behind us, Grimm is still trying to decide what type of series it's going to be."

References

External links
 

Grimm (season 2) episodes
2013 American television episodes